A Suitable Vengeance is a crime novel by Elizabeth George.

References 

1991 American novels
American mystery novels
Bantam Books books